Middle Button Island National Park is an Indian national park located in the Andaman and Nicobar Islands. Along with the neighbouring islands of North Button and South Button, both also national parks, it forms part of the Rani Jhansi Marine National Park off the coast of South Andaman Island.

Attractions and activities
The island has an oceanic climate moderated by the surrounding sea. The island receives much rain during the southwesterly monsoon season between June and October, and most visitors come between December and April. Access is available by boat from Port Blair and visitors should contact the park office for information on scuba diving facilities, entry permits, timing of visits and fees. There is no accommodation in the park but visitors may organise packages to sleep on board vessels, or may camp with prior permission from the park authorities.

Flora and fauna
The island is clad in moist deciduous forest and surrounded by sandy beaches and shallow seas with clear water. Some of the trees and shrubs present include the rattan palm Calamus palustris, the climbing bamboo Dinochloa andamanica and Parishia insignis, Calophyllum soulattri, Artocarpus, Canarium, Dipterocarpus grandiflorus, Dipterocarpus pilosus, Endospermum chinensis, Hopea odorata, Salmalia insignis, Sideroxylon, Aprosa villosula, Baccaurea sapida, Caryota mitis and Dinochloa palustris.

Among the animals found on land are spotted deer, water lizards and monitor lizards. Marine fauna found in the park include dugongs, dolphins, sea turtles, fishes and many species of coral abound. Blue whales have been reported off the coast.

References

National parks in the Andaman and Nicobar Islands
Ritchie's Archipelago
1979 establishments in the Andaman and Nicobar Islands
Protected areas established in 1979
Islands of India
Islands of the Bay of Bengal